Michèle Pranchère-Tomassini is a Luxembourg diplomat. She is Ambassador to Spain.

From 2012 to 2017, she was ambassador to Czech Republic, Estonia, and Ukraine. She was ambassador to Japan.

References 

Year of birth missing (living people)
Living people
Luxembourgian women ambassadors
Ambassadors of Luxembourg to the Czech Republic
Ambassadors of Luxembourg to Estonia
Ambassadors of Luxembourg to Japan
Ambassadors of Luxembourg to Spain
Ambassadors of Luxembourg to Ukraine